The term "The Nine Graces" or Nine Muses referred to the nine women who were the first to be awarded degrees from the Royal University of Ireland in 1884. They were the first women in Great Britain or Ireland to be awarded degrees. Five of the women gained honours and four others also passed. Most of these women had received some of their teaching in Alexandra College.

The Nine Graces

 Isabella Mulvany, headmistress of Alexandra School, activist for women's education
 Alice Oldham (honours in logic, metaphysics, history of philosophy), activist for women's education, teacher
 Jessie Twemlow, later Meredith (honours in modern literature)
 Marion Kelly (honours in modern literature)
 Annie Mary Sands (Rutland School)
 Eliza Wilkins 
 Charlotte M. Taylor (honours in music and modern literature)
 Louisa M. McIntosh (honours in modern literature)
 Emily E. Eberle

Other reading
Knowing Their Place: The Intellectual Life of Women in the 19th Century, Professor Brendan Walsh, The History Press, 15 Jul 2014

References

Alumni of the Royal University of Ireland